Wimilio Vink (born 13 September 1993) is a Dutch footballer who plays as an attacking midfielder for Spakenburg.

Career
Vink finished his formation at Vitesse Arnhem, after a spell with N.E.C. Nijmegen.

On 26 August 2011, Vink made his professional debut, in a 4–1 away defeat against Ajax. On 17 November, he signed a professional contract with Vitesse, until 2014. After he was released in July 2014, Vink signed with Eerste Divisie side MVV Maastricht.

Personal life
Vink's father, Gery Vink, is a youth manager at Ajax.

References

External links
 
 Voetbal International profile 
 Eredivisie profile 

Living people
1993 births
People from Tiel
Dutch footballers
Footballers from Gelderland
Netherlands youth international footballers
Association football midfielders
Eredivisie players
Eerste Divisie players
Tweede Divisie players
SBV Vitesse players
MVV Maastricht players
FC Eindhoven players
SV TEC players
SV Spakenburg players